Ronald Steinhauer is a Canadian curler.

Awards
British Columbia Sports Hall of Fame: inducted in 1995 with all of 1994 Rick Folk team, Canadian and World champions

Teams

References

External links
 
Ron Steinhauer – Curling Canada Stats Archive

Living people
Canadian male curlers
Curlers from British Columbia
Sportspeople from Kelowna
World curling champions
Brier champions
Year of birth missing (living people)